The  Las Vegas Aviators, formerly known as the Las Vegas 51s and Las Vegas Stars, are a Minor League Baseball team of the Pacific Coast League (PCL) and the Triple-A affiliate of the Oakland Athletics. They are located in Summerlin South, Nevada, a community in Las Vegas. The Aviators play their home games at Las Vegas Ballpark, a 10,000-seat facility which opened in 2019. The team previously played at Cashman Field from 1983 to 2018.

The team has been members of the Pacific Coast League since 1983, including the 2021 season when it was known as the Triple-A West, and won the PCL championship as the Stars in 1986 and 1988.

History

Las Vegas Stars (1983–2000) 
The Las Vegas Pacific Coast League franchise traces its roots to the Portland Beavers who entered the PCL in 1919 after a two-year hiatus. The team relocated to Spokane, Washington, in 1973, becoming the Spokane Indians. The franchise moved once again in 1983, becoming the Las Vegas Stars.

The Stars, who were the Triple-A affiliate of the San Diego Padres, became the first professional sports team to play in Las Vegas since the Las Vegas Wranglers baseball club who played from 1947 to 1952 and 1957 to 1958. The Stars' inaugural season was quite successful, posting an 83–60 record and winning the first-half championship for the Southern Division leading to a playoff berth, but eventually losing to the Albuquerque Dukes. The following season, the Stars posted another successful campaign, going 71–65 and winning their second division championship (first half), but ultimately losing in the league semifinals to the Hawaii Islanders. After a dismal 1985 campaign, the Stars finished the 1986 season with an 80–62 record and won the second half of the Southern Division. In the league semifinals, the Stars defeated the Phoenix Firebirds, 3–2, and went on to win their first PCL championship, defeating the Vancouver Canadians in five games. The Stars won their second PCL championship in 1988, once again defeating Vancouver, this time in four games.

After winning five division titles and two league championships in their first six years, the Stars hit a skid, posting a .500 or better record only four times and winning shares of only two division championships in the following 12 years. The Stars were unable to advance past the first round of the playoffs in both seasons that they qualified. The team's affiliation with the Padres ended after the 2000 season.

Las Vegas 51s (2001–2018) 

In 2001, Las Vegas became the top farm club of the Los Angeles Dodgers. The new affiliation was accompanied by rebranding to the Las Vegas 51s in reference to Area 51, a military base located north-northwest of Las Vegas legendary for rumors of its housing UFOs and other extraterrestrial technology. The team adopted a logo featuring a grey alien head and introduced an extraterrestrial mascot named Cosmo.

A new affiliate, moniker, and appearance did not translate into improved performance on the field. The 51s experienced only two winning seasons during their eight years as the Triple-A Dodgers. Their only division title came under manager Brad Mills in 2002 as the team posted the best record in the league at 85–59, but lost three games to one to the eventual PCL champion Edmonton Trappers.

On March 24, 2008, Mandalay Baseball Properties sold the 51s franchise to Stevens Baseball Group. There were no plans to move the team, and talks of building a new stadium to replace the ageing Cashman Field became stagnant. The Dodgers and the 51s had a rocky relationship during their eight-year affiliation. The Dodgers were not pleased with Cashman Field, which barely met the standards for Triple-A baseball. It had no weight room or indoor batting cages, and it was decrepit compared to other stadiums in the league. Citing the inadequacies of Cashman and lack of planning for a replacement, Los Angeles decided not to renew their player development contract (PDC) with Las Vegas after the 2008 season.

Following the departure of the Los Angeles Dodgers, the 51s signed a PDC with the Toronto Blue Jays, marking the first time that the 51s were affiliated with an American League club. The only time the team finished over .500 with the Blue Jays was in 2012 when Marty Brown led the team to a 79–64 second-place finish. The Blue Jays ended their affiliation with the 51s after the season.

In April 2013, the team was purchased by Summerlin Las Vegas Baseball Club LLC, a joint venture of Howard Hughes Corp and Play Ball Owners Group, including investors Steve Mack, Bart Wear, and Chris Kaempfer, with intentions of moving it to a proposed stadium in Summerlin near the Red Rock Resort Spa and Casino.

The 51s became affiliated with the New York Mets in 2013 when they were the only Triple-A team left without an MLB parent. They won back-to-back division titles in 2013 and 2014 under manager Wally Backman, but were eliminated in the Pacific Conference championship series on both occasions.

In 2017 the 51s became one of the first teams to participate in the Copa de la Diversión initiative and for selected games played as the Reyes de Plata ("Silver Kings").  The name was a nod to Nevada being the "Silver State" and a homage to the contribution migrant workers made to the mining industry of Nevada.

In October 2017, the Las Vegas Convention and Visitors Authority approved a 20-year, $80 million naming rights agreement to help pay for the new $150 million 10,000-seat ballpark which opened in 2019. Las Vegas Ballpark, located in Summerlin, includes 22 suites, a center field pool, kids' zone, and several bars. Construction began in 2018 and was completed for the 2019 season.

In late 2017, the Mets announced plans to move its Triple-A affiliation to the Syracuse Mets beginning in 2019, meaning the 51s would be in need of a new major league affiliate.

Las Vegas Aviators (2019–present) 
Following the conclusion of the 2018 season, Las Vegas signed a two-year PDC with the Oakland Athletics that runs through 2020. In addition to having a new major league affiliate in 2019 and playing in a new ballpark, the team also changed its name to the Las Vegas Aviators. The name is in reference to aviation pioneer Howard Hughes. The team's new logo depicts a pilot wearing a flight helmet and utilizes their new color scheme of navy blue, orange, tangerine, gold, yellow, and gray. Their first home game at Las Vegas Ballpark was a 10–2 win against the Sacramento River Cats on April 9 before a sellout crowd of 11,036. Las Vegas secured the win with a five-run second inning in which Skye Bolt scored the winning run when he came home on a fielding error. Aviators pitchers Chris Bassitt and Daniel Mengden combined to strikeout 14 Sacramento batters.

The start of the 2020 season was postponed due to the COVID-19 pandemic before ultimately being cancelled on June 30. In conjunction with Major League Baseball's restructuring of Minor League Baseball in 2021, the Aviators were organized into the Triple-A West. Las Vegas ended the season in third place in the Western Division with a 62–58 record. No playoffs were held to determine a league champion; instead, the team with the best regular-season record was declared the winner. However, 10 games that had been postponed from the start of the season were reinserted into the schedule as a postseason tournament called the Triple-A Final Stretch in which all 30 Triple-A clubs competed for the highest winning percentage. Las Vegas finished the tournament tied for 13th place with a 3–3 record. In 2022, the Triple-A West became known as the Pacific Coast League, the name historically used by the regional circuit prior to the 2021 reorganization.

Season-by-season records

Media 
The Las Vegas Aviators are covered by Las Vegas' two daily newspapers, the Las Vegas Review-Journal and Las Vegas Sun. Every Aviators game is broadcast by KRLV 920-AM, with Russ Langer as the broadcast's play-by-play man. Several prominent sports radio and television personalities made their start as broadcaster for the Stars and 51s, most notably Fox Sports' Colin Cowherd.

Broadcasters 

 Bob Blum (1985–2005)
 Dick Calvert (1983)
 Colin Cowherd (1987–1988)
 Joe Hawk (1983)
 Ken Korach (1989–1995)
 Russ Langer (2000–present)
 Tim Neverett (1996–2003, 2005–2006)
 Paul Olden (1984–1987)
 Jerry Reuss (1994–1995,1999, 2005–present)
 Jon Sandler (1993–1999)
 Dom Valentino (1983–1985, 1987–1989)
 Rich Waltz (1990–1992)

Roster

Award winners

PCL MVP 
1983 – Kevin McReynolds
1986 – Tim Pyznarski
1988 – Sandy Alomar Jr.
1989 – Sandy Alomar Jr.
2001 – Phil Hiatt
2009 – Randy Ruiz
2010 – J. P. Arencibia

PCL Rookie of the Year 
2017 – Amed Rosario

PCL Manager of the Year 
2002 – Brad Mills
2014 – Wally Backman
2019 – Fran Riordan

PCL Executive of the Year 
1992 – Don Logan
1998 – Don Logan
2018 – Don Logan

Notable alumni 

Roberto Alomar
Sandy Alomar Jr.
Pete Alonso
Carlos Baerga
Bruce Bochy
Larry Bowa (manager)
Jolbert Cabrera
Chin-Feng Chen
Michael Conforto
David Cooper
Joey Cora
Ike Davis
Cody Decker
Jake deGrom
Edwin Encarnación
Andre Ethier
Wilmer Flores
Éric Gagné
Nomar Garciaparra (rehab)
Ozzie Guillén
Robert Gsellman
Tony Gwynn
D. J. Houlton
Edwin Jackson
Matt Kemp
Ty Kelly
John Kruk
Seth Lugo
Russell Martin
Gary Matthews Jr.
Steven Matz
Kevin McReynolds
Brad Mills (Manager)
Norihiro Nakamura
T. J. Rivera
Amed Rosario
Cody Ross
David Ross
Jerry Royster (Manager)
Benito Santiago
Dominic Smith
Noah Syndergaard
Joe Thurston
Kevin Towers (General Manager)
Shane Victorino
Jayson Werth
Zack Wheeler
Steve Yeager (hitting coach)

References

External links

 Official website
 Statistics from Baseball-Reference

 
Pacific Coast League teams
San Diego Padres minor league affiliates
Los Angeles Dodgers minor league affiliates
Toronto Blue Jays minor league affiliates
New York Mets minor league affiliates
Oakland Athletics minor league affiliates
Baseball teams established in 1983
Professional baseball teams in Nevada
Sports teams in Las Vegas
1983 establishments in Nevada
Triple-A West teams